Vincent Edward Redd (born September 1, 1985) is a former American football defensive lineman. He was signed by the New England Patriots as an undrafted free agent in 2008. He played college football at Virginia and Liberty.

Redd has also been a member of the Kansas City Chiefs, Calgary Stampeders, Hartford Colonials and New Yorker Lions.

Early years
Redd attended Elizabethton High School in Elizabethton, Tennessee, and was listed as the No. 12 defensive end nationally. He was named to the Orlando Sentinel All-Southern team after he tallied 104 tackles in his career. Redd was also a standout on the basketball team and also lettered in track and finished fourth in the state championship in the shot put as a junior.

College career
In 2007, Redd had 63 tackles, 6.5 sacks and two interceptions at Liberty. He redshirted for the 2006 season after transferring from UVA.  In 2005, played playing time in 10 out of 12 games at the University of Virginia and finished with 16 tackles and three TFL. In 2004 with the Cavaliers, played in all 12 and saw time at linebacker and on special teams return units.

Professional career

New England Patriots
Redd was signed by the New England Patriots as an undrafted free agent on May 1, 2008, following the 2008 NFL Draft. He was waived by the team on August 30, 2008, and signed to the team's practice squad on September 1, 2008. He was then promoted to the team's active roster on November 22, 2008. He was waived on August 2, 2009, after the team signed linebacker Rob Ninkovich.

Kansas City Chiefs
A day after being waived by the New England Patriots, Redd was claimed off waivers by the Kansas City Chiefs on August 3, 2009. He was waived on August 24. The same day, it was revealed was suspended four games by the NFL for violation of the league's drug policy.

Calgary Stampeders
Redd signed a practice roster agreement with the Calgary Stampeders on October 8, 2009, after his NFL suspension ended.

Alabama Vipers
Redd signed with the Alabama Vipers of Arena Football 1 on December 15, 2009.

New Yorker Lions
Redd signed with the New Yorker Lions of the German Football League on February 17, 2013.

References

External links
Kansas City Chiefs bio
Liberty Flames bio
New England Patriots bio

1985 births
Living people
African-American players of American football
Alabama Vipers players
American football defensive ends
American football linebackers
American football offensive linemen
American players of Canadian football
Calgary Stampeders players
Canadian football linebackers
German Football League players
Hartford Colonials players
Kansas City Chiefs players
Liberty Flames football players
New England Patriots players
People from Elizabethton, Tennessee
Players of American football from Tennessee
Virginia Cavaliers football players
American expatriate sportspeople in Germany
American expatriate players of American football